United Nations Security Council Resolution 412, adopted unanimously on July 7, 1977, after examining the application of the Republic of Djibouti for membership in the United Nations, the Council recommended to the General Assembly that Djibouti be admitted.

See also
 List of United Nations member states
 List of United Nations Security Council Resolutions 401 to 500 (1976–1982)

References
Text of the Resolution at undocs.org

External links
 

 0412
 0412
 0412
1977 in Djibouti
July 1977 events